The King's Canyon Petroglyphs are a prehistoric rock art site near Clarksville, Arkansas.  The site includes a panel petroglyphs, which include depictions of a sunburst motif and what look like turkey tracks.  The latter is a particularly uncommon subject for rock art in this area.

The site was listed on the National Register of Historic Places in 1982.

See also
National Register of Historic Places listings in Johnson County, Arkansas

References

Archaeological sites on the National Register of Historic Places in Arkansas
National Register of Historic Places in Johnson County, Arkansas
Petroglyphs in Arkansas